Acantholimon ulicinum (ulicinum: yoo-lih-SEE-num), also known as the prickly thief, is a species of broadleaf evergreen plants in the family Plumbaginaceae. The species is endemic to the eastern Mediterranean region (Greece, the Balkans and Turkey) where it grows in dry soil. From June to July is when Acantholimon ulicinum blooms, with pale pink flowers. It has crowded, rigid, hard-textured, spiny-tipped, linear and needle-like leaves, and five-petaled pink flowers in short-stalked inflorescences.

References 

ulicinum
Flora of Southeastern Europe